Matthew Slater is an American politician currently serving as a member of the New York State Assembly, representing the 94th district. Before joining the New York State Assembly, Slater served as town supervisor for the Town of Yorktown.

Early life and education 
Slater was born in Yorktown, New York, and graduated from Yorktown High School in 2004. He attended Saint Anselm College, where he received his bachelor's degree in political science. He then attended Marist College where he received his master's in public administration.

Political career 
Slater's was first elected to office in 2020 when he was elected town supervisor for Yorktown, New York, after beating incumbent Supervisor Ilan Gilbert . During his tenure Slater helped Yorktown’s budget through spending cuts and economic growth and cut town taxes. He also helped add many major companies to the area. Slater then ran for the New York State Assembly in the 94th district challenging Democratic candidate Kathleen Valletta-McMorrow. He won receiving 64.5% of the votes. He was sworn in on January 1, 2023.

References 

Living people
People from Yorktown, New York
New York (state) Republicans
Year of birth missing (living people)